Erik Agne Östlund (born 23 September 1962) is a retired Swedish cross-country skier who competed from 1983 to 1987. He won two 4 × 10 km relay medals at the FIS Nordic World Ski Championships with one gold (1987) and one bronze (1985).

Östlund's best individual finish was third in a 30 km event in La Bresse (France) on 11 January 1986.

Östlund is married to cross-country skier Marie-Helene Östlund (née Westin).

Cross-country skiing results
All results are sourced from the International Ski Federation (FIS).

World Championships
 2 medals – (1 gold, 1 bronze)

World Cup

Season standings

Individual podiums

1 podium

Team podiums

 5 victories 
 7 podiums

Note:   Until the 1999 World Championships, World Championship races were included in the World Cup scoring system.

References

External links

1962 births
Living people
Swedish male cross-country skiers
FIS Nordic World Ski Championships medalists in cross-country skiing
Dala-Järna IK skiers